This is a very incomplete list of Gaelic footballers who have played at senior level for the Dublin county team.

List of players

A
 Paddy Andrews: 12 years, until 2021

B
 Keith Barr
 Denis Bastick: Until 2017, championship debut in 2009
 Paul Bealin
 Alan Brogan
 Bernard Brogan Jnr: Until 2019, championship debut in 2007, 116 league and championship appearances, scoring 36 goals and 344 points (452)
 Bernard Brogan Snr
 Jim Brogan
 Paul Brogan

C
 John Caffrey
 Tommy Carr
 Paul Clarke
 Stephen Cluxton
 Diarmuid Connolly: Until 2020
 Paddy Cullen
 Paul Curran

D
 Darren Daly: 12 years, until 2020
 Tommy Drumm
 Kieran Duff

F
 Dessie Farrell
 Paul Flynn: Until 2019

G
 Mick Galvin
 Jim Gavin
 Pat Gilroy

H
 Tony Hanahoe
 Gerry Hargan
 Ray Hazley
 Kevin Heffernan
 David Hickey
 Mick Holden

K
 Jimmy Keaveney
 Robbie Kelleher

M
 Noel McCaffrey
 John McCarthy
 Philly McMahon: Until 2021, championship debut in 2008
 Kevin McManamon: 2010-2021
 Brian Mullins
 Vinnie Murphy

O
 Eoghan O'Gara: Until 2019, debut in 2008 National League
 John O'Leary
 Pat O'Neill
 Cian O'Sullivan: Until 2021
 Anton O'Toole

R
 Charlie Redmond
 Barney Rock

S
 Jack Sheedy
 Jason Sherlock

W
 Ciarán Whelan: 1996–2009, debut v Meath in 1996 Leinster final

References

Players
 
Lists of inter-county Gaelic football players